Dennis Schultz (born February 19, 1951) is an American former sprinter.

References

1951 births
Living people
American male sprinters
Place of birth missing (living people)
Universiade medalists in athletics (track and field)
Universiade gold medalists for the United States
Medalists at the 1973 Summer Universiade
20th-century American people